Hisaichi (written: 寿一 or 壽一) is a masculine Japanese given name. Notable people with the name include:

, Japanese manga artist
, Imperial Japanese army marshal and commander of the Southern Expeditionary Army Group

Japanese masculine given names